Washington García Rijo (1921 – 22 September 2010) was a Uruguayan political figure.

Background 

His political base has been in Rocha Department. He formerly served as a senior police officer. He is a member of the Colorado Party (Uruguay).

Political career 

He served for many years as an elected Deputy of the Republic from 1967 to 1972 and from 1985 to 1990, representing Rocha Department. He was at the time associated with the 'Lista 15' grouping within the Colorado Party. In his late political life he endorsed Pedro Bordaberry Herrán's 'Vamos Uruguay' grouping within the Colorado Party (Uruguay).

See also 

 Politics of Uruguay
 Colorado Party (Uruguay)#Post 2004: defeat at polls and rise of Pedro Bordaberry Herrán

References

Members of the Chamber of Representatives of Uruguay
Colorado Party (Uruguay) politicians
1921 births
2010 deaths